Blood gas tension refers to the partial pressure of gases in blood. There are several significant purposes for measuring gas tension. The most common gas tensions measured are oxygen tension (PxO2), carbon dioxide tension (PxCO2) and carbon monoxide tension (PxCO). The subscript x in each symbol represents the source of the gas being measured: "a" meaning arterial, "A" being alveolar, "v" being venous, and "c" being capillary. Blood gas tests (such as arterial blood gas tests) measure these partial pressures.

Oxygen tension
Arterial blood oxygen tension (normal)
PaO2 – Partial pressure of oxygen at sea level (160 mmHg in the atmosphere, 21% of standard atmospheric pressure of 760 mmHg) in arterial blood is between 75 mmHg and 100 mmHg.

Venous blood oxygen tension (normal)
PvO2 – Oxygen tension in venous blood at sea level is between 30 mmHg and 40 mmHg.

Carbon dioxide tension
Carbon dioxide is a by-product of food metabolism and in high amounts has toxic effects including: dyspnea, acidosis and altered consciousness.

Arterial blood carbon dioxide tension
PaCO2 – Partial pressure of carbon dioxide at sea level in arterial blood is between 35 mmHg and 45 mmHg.

Venous blood carbon dioxide tension
PvCO2 – Partial pressure of carbon dioxide at sea level in venous blood is between 40 mmHg and 50 mmHg.

Carbon monoxide tension
Arterial carbon monoxide tension (normal)
PaCO – Partial pressure of CO at sea level in arterial blood is approximately 0.02. It can be slightly higher in smokers and people living in dense urban areas.

Significance
The partial pressure of gas in blood is significant because it is directly related to  gas exchange, as the driving force of  diffusion across the  blood gas barrier and thus blood oxygenation.

Equations

Oxygen content 

The constant, 1.36, is the amount of oxygen (ml at 1 atmosphere) bound per gram of hemoglobin. The exact value of this constant varies from 1.34 to 1.39, depending on the reference and the way it is derived. SaO2 refers to the percent of arterial hemoglobin that is saturated with oxygen. The constant 0.0031 represents the amount of oxygen dissolved in plasma per mm Hg of partial pressure. The dissolved-oxygen term is generally small relative to the term for hemoglobin-bound oxygen, but becomes significant at very high PaO2 (as in a hyperbaric chamber) or in severe anemia.

Oxygen saturation 

This is an estimation and does not account for differences in temperature, pH and concentrations of 2,3 DPG.

See also
 Alveolar air equation
 Fick's laws of diffusion
 Fraction of inspired oxygen

References

Hematology
Respiratory therapy
Pulmonology